George Brooks Young (July 24, 1840 – December 30, 1906) was an American jurist and lawyer.

Born in Boston, Massachusetts, Young graduated from Harvard Law School in 1863. He was admitted to the New York bar, in New York City, in 1864. In 1870, Young moved to Saint Paul, Minnesota and continued to practice law. In 1874 and 1875, Young served on the Minnesota Supreme Court. Then from 1875 to 1892, Young served as the Minnesota Supreme Court Reporter. Young then continued to practice law. He died in Saint Paul, Minnesota.

Notes

1840 births
1906 deaths
Lawyers from Boston
Politicians from New York City
Politicians from Saint Paul, Minnesota
New York (state) lawyers
Minnesota lawyers
Justices of the Minnesota Supreme Court
Harvard Law School alumni
19th-century American judges